George W. Blackburn [Smiling George] (September 21, 1871 – after 1919) was a right-handed pitcher in Major League Baseball who played for the Baltimore Orioles in the  season. A native of Ozark, Missouri, he spent 17 years in baseball as a player, coach, and manager

Blackburn posted a 2–2 record with a 6.82 earned run average in five pitching appearances with the Orioles, allowing 30 runs (25 earned) on 34 hits and 12 walks while striking out one batter in 33 innings of work.

On July 16, 1897, Cap Anson of the Chicago Cubs became the first player in major league history to reach 3,000 hits when he singled off Blackburn.

Blackburn also pitched for 34 different minor league teams from 1892 through 1909 and managed six of its teams in 1896 (two), 1903 and from 1907 to 1909, retiring at the age of 48. His date of death is missing.

Sources

1871 births
Place of death missing
Year of death missing
Major League Baseball pitchers
Baltimore Orioles (NL) players
Minor league baseball managers
Augusta Electricians players
Austin Senators players
Charleston Seagulls players
Dallas Hams players
Dallas Navigators players
Dallas Steers players
Evansville Black Birds players
Fort Worth Panthers players
Galveston Sand Crabs players
Greenville Cotton Pickers players
Indianapolis Hoosiers (minor league) players
Indianapolis Indians players
Jacksonville Jays players
Little Rock Travelers players
Macon Brigands players
Minneapolis Millers (baseball) players
Montgomery Colts players
Montgomery Senators players
Nashville Vols players
Pine Bluff Lumbermen players
Pueblo Indians players
Regina Bone Pilers players
Rome Romans players
Sedalia Goldbugs players
Shreveport Tigers players
Syracuse Stars (minor league baseball) players
Topeka White Sox players
Utica Pent Ups players
Vicksburg Hill Billies players
Vicksburg Hill Climbers players
Wilkes-Barre Coal Barons players
19th-century baseball players
Baseball players from Missouri
People from Ozark, Missouri